The Bersal or Barswal or  Barsal or Barsala or  Barsar or Badsar is a Suryavanshi Rajput  clan, and were Rajas of Kashmir and Kangra. The Hindu branch provided the Maharajas of Jammu and Kashmir.

Name variation
This goth of Rajput has different spelling variation in different regions. In Punjab and Himachal Pradesh state it is written as Barsar. In Uttar Pradesh it is written as Badsar. In Rajasthan it is written as Bersal. In Dehradun, Uttarakhand and in Kangra, Himachal Pradesh it is written as "Barswal".

References

Rajput clans
Social groups of Jammu and Kashmir